Rezaabad (also Romanized as Reẕāābād and Rez̧āābād) is a village in Qanibeyglu Rural District, Zanjanrud District, Zanjan County, Zanjan Province, Iran. At the 2006 census, its population was 543, in 125 families.

Crops 
The village is known as the "Green Jewel Zone", and the best quality is the variety of apples (Pippin apple, Golden apple, etc.) and other garden products with a qualitative export status.

References 

Populated places in Zanjan County